Smith Memorial may refer to the following:

Awards
Edward E. Smith Memorial Award

Building and structures
Alfred H. Smith Memorial Bridge in Castleton-on-Hudson and Selkirk, New York
Jedediah Smith Memorial Trail in California
Joseph Smith Birthplace Memorial near Sharon and South Royalton, Vermont
Joseph Smith Memorial Building in Salt Lake City, Utah
Lawrence Smith Memorial Airport in Harrisonville, Missouri
Smith Memorial Arch in Philadelphia, Pennsylvania
Smith Memorial Library in Chautauqua, New York
Smith Memorial Student Union in Portland, Oregon
Smith Memorial Playground & Playhouse in Philadelphia, Pennsylvania
Tina Weedon Smith Memorial Hall in Urbana, Illinois
Watters Smith Memorial State Park in Harrison, West Virginia
W. H. Smith Memorial School in Varanasi, India
William Henry Smith Memorial Library in Indianapolis, Indiana

Events
Alfred E. Smith Memorial Foundation Dinner
John Smith Memorial Mace

Organizations
W. Eugene Smith Memorial Fund